Louis Camara (Abdou Karim Camara) is a Senegalese writer known for his short stories and tales.

Biography
Louis Camara, the storyteller of Ifà as he is popularly known, was born in 1950 at the edge of the Senegal River in Saint Louis, located 270 km from Dakar, Senegal. Researcher, novelist, and short story writer, Camara is passionate about Yoruba civilization and culture which remains its main source of inspiration,. He taught at Université Gaston Berger in Saint Louis, Senegal. He has attended numerous festivals and was a guest at the Francophonies en Limousin Festival in Limoges, France.
Until 2000, he worked at the Musée du Centre de Recherche et de documentation du Sénégal(CRDS) based in St. Louis. In 1996, he was awarded the Grand Prix du président de la république pour les lettres, the highest literary honor in Senegal for his most famous work Le Choix de l’Ori, “a tale that highlights the architecture, the rhythm, and style of black Africa”, according to Abdou Diouf then President of the Republic of Senegal. A revised and edited version of the novel is published by Amalion in 2015.

Works
 Le Choix de l’Ori, Editions Amalion, Dakar, 2015, 
 Au-dessus des dunes, Editions Athena édif, 2014, 
 Histoire d’Iyewa ou les pièges de l’amour, Xamal Publishing, St. Louis 1998 
 Kankan le maléfique, Éditions Hurtubise HMH Quebec 
 Le tambour d’Orunmila, NEAS, Dakar, 2003, 
 La tragique histoire d’Aganoribi, Éditions Kalaama Dakar, 2005 
 Il pleut sur Saint-Louis, short stories, NEAS Dakar, 2007, 
 Saint-Louis du Sénégal, Senegal, Editions Print Book, 
 La forêt aux mille demons (French adaptation of "A Forest of a Thousand Daemons" by Wole Soyinka) EENAS Dakar, 2010

Awards
 Grand prix du président de la république du Sénégal pour les lettres in 1996, 
 Leopold Sedar Senghor Foundation prize for the best short story in 1997, 
 Chevalier des Palmes Académiques de la république française in 2010.

References

21st-century Senegalese writers
Living people
Year of birth missing (living people)
People from Saint-Louis, Senegal
Chevaliers of the Ordre des Palmes Académiques